The 1989 1. divisjon season, the highest women's football (soccer) league in Norway, began on 29 April 1989 and ended on 1 October 1989.

18 games were played with 3 points given for wins and 1 for draws. Number nine and ten were relegated, while two teams from the 2. divisjon were promoted through a playoff round.

Asker won the league.

League table

Top goalscorers
 19 goals:
  Gunn Nyborg, Asker
 18 goals:
  Sissel Grude, Klepp
  Eva Gjelten, Trondheims-Ørn
 15 goals:
  Lisbeth Bakken, Sprint/Jeløy
 14 goals:
  Lena Haugen, Setskog/Høland
 13 goals:
  Linda Medalen, Asker
 12 goals:
  Turid Storhaug, Klepp
  Hege Riise, Setskog/Høland
 11 goals:
  Petra Bartelmann, Asker
  Trude Stendal, Sprint/Jeløy
  Katrin Skarsbø, Sprint/Jeløy
 10 goals:
  Torill Hoch-Nielsen, Jardar
  Elin Krokan, Skedsmo
  Heidi Støre, Sprint/Jeløy
 9 goals:
  Lene Olsen, Sprint/Jeløy

Promotion and relegation
 Sandviken and Vard were relegated to the 2. divisjon.
 Fløya and BUL were promoted from the 2. divisjon through play-offs.

References
League table
Fixtures
Goalscorers

Norwegian First Division (women) seasons
Top level Norwegian women's football league seasons
women
Nor
Nor